The Troika is an amusement park ride designed and manufactured by HUSS Park Attractions in the mid-1970s. The name Troika means "group of three" in Russian, a reference to its three armed design. There are several variations on the design.

Design 
HUSS Park Attractions designed and manufactured the first Troika ride in the mid-1970s. It is named after the Russian word meaning "group of three", a reference to its three armed design.

Description and operation

A Troika consists of three arms radiating from a central column. At the end of each arm is a wheel-like assembly (star) holding seven gondolas, each of which seats 2 people side by side.

When the ride is activated, the central column rotates clockwise, while the Star at the end of each arm rotates counterclockwise. Hydraulic cylinders then raise the arms to an angle of 40°. The gondolas do have some capacity to rock from side to side, but this is minimal. At the end of the ride cycle, the arms are lowered, and the rotation stopped. Because it is a relatively mild thrill ride, it is a good ride for younger children or beginning riders who aren't up to riding more extreme attractions, like Huss's own Enterprise or Top Spin.

The main safety restraint is a buzz bar system, which locks into one of five positions. Huss recommends that riders be at least 42 inches tall with an adult or over 50 inches tall to ride alone.

Variants and modern adaptions
The ride is available in both transportable and permanent forms, although due to the total weight and size of the ride (35 tons, plus an additional 27 tons for the temporary base and platform), transportable Troikas are unpopular and uncommon.

Portable versions of the Troika can be disassembled, but due to the size and weight of the machinery and platform, rack onto no fewer than three trailers.

AirBoat
Huss now makes a modern version of the Troika, called the AirBoat. It is smaller and can only carry 24 people (with 3 pods and 4 cars per pod). It runs at about the same speed. One example that is no longer running was the Gator Bait ride at Six Flags New Orleans; this ride closed due to damage from Hurricane Katrina in 2005.

Scorpion
The Tivoli Scorpion is based on the same pattern as the Troika, but a much smaller gondola wheel diameter results in greater speed and centripetal force experienced by the riders (claimed to be over ). The Scorpion is significantly lighter than a Troika, making it more popular for operation at carnivals and fairs.

Troika Installations

See also

 Twist (ride)

References

Amusement rides
Amusement rides introduced in 1975
Articles containing video clips